The 661st Radar Squadron is an inactive United States Air Force unit. It was last assigned to the 23d Air Division, Aerospace Defense Command, stationed at Selfridge Air Force Base, Michigan. It was inactivated on 1 July 1974.

The unit was a General Surveillance Radar squadron providing for the air defense of the United States.

Lineage
 Activated as 661st Aircraft Control and Warning Squadron, 5 December 1949
 Redesignated 661st Radar Squadron (SAGE), 1 September 1959
 Redesignated 661st Radar Squadron, 1 February 1974
 Inactivated on 1 July 1974

Assignments
 541st Aircraft Control and Warning Group, 1 January 1951
 30th Air Division, 6 February 1952
 4708th Defense Wing, 16 February 1953
 30th Air Division, 8 July 1956
 Detroit Air Defense Sector, 1 April 1959
 34th Air Division, 1 April 1966
 29th Air Division, 14 November 1969
 23d Air Division, 19 November 1969 - 1 July 1974

Stations
 Selfridge AFB, Michigan, 5 December 1949 - 1 July 1974

References

  Cornett, Lloyd H. and Johnson, Mildred W., A Handbook of Aerospace Defense Organization  1946 - 1980,  Office of History, Aerospace Defense Center, Peterson AFB, CO (1980).
 Winkler, David F. & Webster, Julie L., Searching the Skies, The Legacy of the United States Cold War Defense Radar Program,  US Army Construction Engineering Research Laboratories, Champaign, IL (1997).

External links

Radar squadrons of the United States Air Force
Aerospace Defense Command units